Daniel Lytle Dolan (28 May 1951 – 26 April 2022) was an American Catholic sedevacantist bishop.

Biography

Priesthood
Lefebvre directed the SSPX's American priests to follow the 1962 liturgical books. Dolan and eight other American priests refused to do these. On 27 April 1983, these nine priests, along with some seminarians who were sympathetic to them, were promptly expelled from the SSPX by Lefebvre, for their refusal to use the 1962 Missal and for other reasons, such as their resistance to Lefebvre's order that priests of the SSPX must accept the decrees of nullity handed down by diocesan marriage tribunals, and their disapproval of the SSPX's policy of accepting into the society new members who had been ordained to the priesthood according to the revised sacramental rites of Paul VI. Almost immediately, these priests formed the Society of Saint Pius V (SSPV).

Episcopacy

On 30 November 1993, in Saint Gertrude the Great Church, West Chester, Pivarunas consecrated Dolan a bishop.

On 11 May 1999, in Acapulco, Guerrero, Mexico, Dolan assisted as the co-consecrator in Pivarunas' episcopal consecration of Father Martín Dávila Gandara of the Sociedad Sacerdotal Trento (Priestly Union of Trent).

On 22 February 2018, in Brooksville, Florida, United States, Dolan assisted as a co-consecrator in Bishop Donald Sanborn's episcopal consecration of Father Joseph Selway of the Roman Catholic Institute.

On 29 September 2021, Dolan consecrated Brazilian Father Rodrigo da Silva, a former priest of the SSPX-Resistance, as a bishop for Mexico and South America.

On 26 April 2022, Father Stephen McKenna of Saint Gertrude the Great Church announced the sudden death of Bishop Dolan on the same day.

References

External links

1951 births
2022 deaths
American traditionalist Catholics
People expelled from the Society of St. Pius X
Thục line bishops
Traditionalist Catholic bishops
Sedevacantists
Clergy from Detroit